The North Bay Regional Health Center (NBRHC) is a hospital located on a 32-acre site off Highway 17 in North Bay, Ontario. This Northern Ontario hospital consists of 2 main buildings which cover 70,171m2 of the site. The 3-storey District Hospital occupies 275 acute care beds while the 2-storey Regional Mental Health Center contains 113 beds. The main circulation hall, known as “Main Street”, runs along the entire length of the hospital and acts as a link between facilities.

The North Bay Regional Health Center was designed by local architecture firm Evans Bertrand Hill Wheeler Architecture Inc., with Brian Bertrand assigned to the project as lead architect. This facility combined the two former and separate sites of the St. Joseph’s General Hospital – North Bay and the Northeast Mental Health Center.

During initial design discussions for the facility, redesigning and modernizing the former St. Joseph’s General Hospital was discussed. The cost of a redesign on this scale, however, would have been equivalent, or higher, than designing and building an entirely new structure. The location on which to construct the NBRHC was carefully chosen, as this new facility would be built to accommodate North Bay and the surrounding regions in both general acute health care and mental health care services. Of the 28 sites considered, 50 College Drive was seen to offer ease of access for patients, a stark natural surrounding and room for further development. Once the location was confirmed, the design process began and construction crews broke ground on March 24, 2007.

Design Objectives 
Several design principles were adopted for the NBRHC. The patient’s point of view were considerably studied. Patients have control over their rooms by having the opportunity to adjust lighting and food, while providing convenience and universally accessible layout, thus the NBRHC is designed with the well-being of the patients, staff and visitor in mind. First and foremost, however, a focus of the design was to engage the five senses;

 Sight: the sense of sight is represented in the design as the concept of a village on a hill. This gives residents and patients a room with a sense of  familiarity by conveying views that evoke a feeling of a home, as opposed to that of an institution. Additionally, pleasant visual cues are dispersed though the facility, including many artworks from local artists. Another key aspect in the visual design are the south facing acute care beds, allowing natural light to penetrate each room. Further, the patient rooms are divided into four wings, each assigned its own season. Visual and written cues in these color coordinated wings aim to help patients and visitors find their way through the 3-storey hospital.  
 Sound: both music and quiet areas have been added throughout “Main Street”, in to provide visitors and patients a calm and peaceful place.
 Touch: a series of natural materials are noticeable throughout the hospital. This ranges from wood to water, demonstrated using glass, in order to provide patients and residents a sensory experience with the textural components of the building.
 Taste / Smell: multiple food services are included to resonate with the senses of taste and smell.
Another major component in the design was to provide patients with a connection to nature, as part of the Biophilic Design, this one considers how the users are connected with nature as its main design aspect. Evans Bertrand Hill Wheeler Architecture Inc. wanted to provide an appropriate amount of space for staff members to efficiently work, while also providing a connection for the patients with the surrounding natural environment. In order to achieve this, found throughout the hospital are gardens, greenhouses, sweat lodges and the spiritual labyrinth were added. In addition, the actual implemented design scheme of the NBRHC has one main circulation hall on the ground floor level which cradles the topography of the hillside located North of the building. This hallway, named “Main Street” is a bright, spacious corridor that highlights the use of wood as a decorative and structural elements, this one connects the Regional Mental Health Center with the District Hospital. With this design, the NBRHC breaks the usual standards of hospital layouts, with the intention of portraying the facility as a neighborhood of network, rather than an institution.

The Use of Wood 
The use of wood as a healing element is one of the main design initiatives that architect Brian Bertrand implemented into this project. A study by the University of British Columbia determined that wood as a design feature is known to calm individuals and reduce stress. Therefore, every patient room is designed with wooden doors and cabinetry to reduce the institutional atmosphere of a traditional health center. Since the Algonquin Park is located a few kilometers south of North Bay, the wooden materials were locally sourced, thus associating the design of the hospital with the history of North Bay as part of the Boreal Forest.

Innovations 
As part of the B-2 Occupancy Code, which includes any health care related unit, the NBRHC is the first hospital in Ontario to incorporate wood into its design. By doing so the firm was rewarded three Wood WORKS! awards in 2010.
Additionally, a Heat Exchange Unit was implemented to provide fresh air into every room while recovering heat when the exterior temperature is low. As part of the stress-free environment, most patients’ rooms are facing south, large windows are strategically placed to allow sunrays to reach the patient’s bed.

The architecture team, along with the hospital administrators, aimed to reduce the impact on the environment and communities that surrounds the NBRHC by making the hospital as "green" as possible. Therefore, reducing the energy that is consumed to operate the hospital, improving the air quality within and extending the overall life of the building made the NBRHC LEED certified. Consequently, the cost reduction for electrical and mechanical equipment was reduced by $825,000. Additionally, the "green" design resulted in a reduction of 1,890 tons of greenhouse gas emissions annually. These initiatives all meet the LEED policies. Further, the hospital has two supplementary fuel sources; cogeneration and biomass, which can heat and power the hospital when maximum patient capacity is reached. The use of Biomass is manifested through the hospital's sustainable strategy, since this one uses slash to produce heat and electricity, which is wood debris lef tover from logging.

References 

Hospitals in Ontario
Buildings and structures in North Bay, Ontario